Hogla may refer to:
Hogla, Bangladesh
Hogla, Israel
Hoglah, one of the five daughters of Zelophehad.